This list of episodes of Conan details information on the 2012 episodes of Conan, a television program on TBS hosted by Conan O'Brien. Between June 11–14, the show was taped at the Chicago Theatre in Chicago, Illinois.

2012

January

February

March

April

May

June

July

August

September

October

November

December

Notes
Jon Dore's scheduled appearance on November 27, 2012 was cancelled. He instead performed on December 17, 2012.

References

Episodes (2012)
Conan
2012 in American television

tr:Conan bölümleri listesi